Greengate is the name of several places in the United Kingdom:
 Greengate, Greater Manchester
 Greengate, London
 Greengate, Norfolk
 Greengate, Rochdale
 Greengate, Salford

Other
 GreenGate, design company based in Denmark
 Greengate Centre
 Greengate Power Corporation
 Greengate House (in Greengate, East London)
 List of United Kingdom locations: Gree-Gz
 Greengate Lighting Controls by Cooper Industries
 , a Singaporean steamship
 Greengate, an electronic musical instrument company, maker of the Greengate DS:3 sampler for Apple II computers

See also
 Greengates